Wierzbiak is a river of Poland, a tributary of the Kaczawa northeast of Legnica.

Rivers of Poland
Rivers of Lower Silesian Voivodeship